James Joseph Munday (1 November 1917 – 27 July 1971) was an Australian rules footballer who played with Geelong in the VFL. Munday won the 1944 Carji Greeves Medal for Geelong's best and fairest player, in his debut season.

Munday later served in the Royal Australian Air Force during World War II.

References

External links

1917 births
1971 deaths
Geelong Football Club players
Carji Greeves Medal winners
Australian rules footballers from Victoria (Australia)
Coburg Football Club players